Nick Remy Matthews, ACS, is a British-born, Australian-raised director of photography who lives in Spain. In 2020 he was named "Cinematographer of the Year" by the Australian Cinematographer's Society. He was also named byVariety as one of the "10 Cinematographers to Watch" in 2019 for his work on Hotel Mumbai., a factual action drama depicting the Mumbai terror attacks, directed by long time collaborator Anthony Maras. The film stars Dev Patel, Armie Hammer, Nazanin Boniadi, Anupam Kher, Suhail Nayyar, Jason Isaacs, Natasha Liu Bordizzo and Tilda Cobham-Hervey and premiered at the Toronto International Film Festival on 7 September 2018 where Matthews was singled out for praise for his work on the film. Rolling Stone declare that "Even in the chaos of bullets and bombs — kudos to ace cinematographer Nick Remy Matthews — Maras creates a sense of actual lives hanging in the balance.". The Hollywood Reporter also praises the "...kinetic cinematography..." that enhances "...the idea that these are real events.". Variety describes the film as "Stunningly framed and photographed..." and as having a "...visual striking aesthetic."Washington Square News describes the film's cinematography as spanning "...cramped utility closets and breathtaking skylines, a visual treat from beginning to end."

In 2017, Matthews photographed The Chaperone for PBS and Masterpiece in New York City; the tale of 1920s silent movie actress Louise Brooks played by rising star Haley Lu Richardson. Oscar nominee Elizabeth McGovern, Golden Globe winner Blythe Danner, and Campbell Scott also star. The film opened in limited release in the US on 29 March 2019. Observer describes the film as being "Elegantly photographed with period Jazz Age splendor by Nick Remy Matthews..."

Writing and Directing

Matthews' directorial debut feature film, psychological drama thriller One Eyed Girl, premiered at the 2014 Austin Film Festival where he and co-writer Craig Behenna won the prestigious Dark Matters Jury Prize. The film was described by The Hollywood Reporter as an "...engrossing, darkly tinged drama", "...an auspicious debut", and declared that the film "...explores the dark matters of the soul with an engrossing intensity".

Early works

In 2010 he won an AFI Award for his cinematography on short film The Kiss, directed by Ashlee Page. In the same year he photographed Anthony Maras's AFI award-winning short The Palace, the two having collaborated a few years earlier on Maras' other AFI winning short Spike Up.

In 2005 he photographed, produced, and co-edited Murali K. Thalluri's Australian feature film 2:37, that premiered at Le Festival de Cannes, in Un Certain Regard in 2006.

Representation

He is represented by Tara Kromer at The Gersh Agency in New York City and managed by Peter Dealbert at Pacific View Management in Los Angeles.

Filmography
 Modern Love (2006)
 2:37 (2006)
 Spike Up (2007)
 Broken Hill (2009)
 The Kiss (2010)
 The Palace
 One Eyed Girl (2015)
 Hotel Mumbai (2018)
 The Chaperone (2018)
 The man in the woods (2019)
 SAS: Red Notice (2019)
 Love, Weddings & Other Disasters (2020)
 Furia (2020)
 The Seventh Day (2021)
 ISS (2023)
 The Bastard Son & The Devil Himself” (Television Series) (2022)
 The Bagman (2023)
 Furia:The Resurrection (Television Series) (2023)

Awards and nominations

2020 Australian Cinematographer of the Year for Hotel Mumbai

2019 Variety 10 Cinematographers to watch for Hotel Mumbai

2015 Beverly Hills Film Festival - Best Film - Audience Choice Award for One Eyed Girl

2014 Austin Film Festival
Dark Matters Jury Award for One Eyed Girl

2010 AFI Awards
AFI for Cinematography; outstanding Achievement in Short Film Craft for The Kiss.

2012/2011 Flickerfest International Short Film Festival, Australia

Best Cinematography for Collision (Nick Remy Matthews/Sam King) and Best Cinematography for The Kiss

2011 Show Me Shorts Film Festival, New Zealand
PANAVISION Best Cinematographer for The Kiss.

2012 St Kilda Film Festival, Australia
Best Achievement in Cinematography for Paper Planes

2007, 2012 Australian Cinematographers' Society National Awards
Golden Tripods – for Azadi and The Palace

References

External links
 

Australian film directors
Australian cinematographers
Writers from Adelaide
Photographers from Adelaide
Anglo-Indian people
Flinders University alumni
Living people
1972 births
People from Buckinghamshire